Sokratis Aristodimou (born 4 May 1970) is a Cypriot alpine skier. He competed at the 1988 Winter Olympics and the 1992 Winter Olympics.

References

External links
 

1970 births
Living people
Cypriot male alpine skiers
Olympic alpine skiers of Cyprus
Alpine skiers at the 1988 Winter Olympics
Alpine skiers at the 1992 Winter Olympics
Place of birth missing (living people)